Kathryn Ainsworth, also known as Katt Ainsworth, is an Australian netball player who played for Surrey Storm in the Netball Superleague. She was a member of the Storm teams that won Superleague titles in 2015 and 2016.

Playing career

Australia
Ainsworth is originally from East Ballina/Ballina, New South Wales and attended Southern Cross K-12. She initially played junior netball with the local association. She subsequently played with both the Lismore–based North Coast Academy of Sport and the New South Wales Institute of Sport. She also represented New South Wales at under-17 level. She later  played for the Queensland Academy of Sport, for Suncoast Lynx of the Queensland State League and represented Queenlands at under-17 and under-21 levels, captaining the latter team.

Surrey Storm
Between 2012 and 2016, Ainsworth played for Surrey Storm in the Netball Superleague. She arrived in London in 2010 on a Contiki holiday and decided to stay. After she began playing social netball, she was encouraged to try out for Surrey Storm. She was a member of the Storm teams that won Superleague titles in 2015 and 2016.

Honours
Surrey Storm
Netball Superleague
Winners: 2015, 2016: 2
Runners up: 2012, 2014: 2

References 

1980s births
Living people
Australian netball players
Netball Superleague players
Australian expatriate netball people in England
Surrey Storm players
New South Wales Institute of Sport netball players
Netball players from New South Wales
Queensland state netball league players
Sportswomen from New South Wales